Geoffrey Frederick Truett (23 May 1935 – 5 January 2015) was an English professional footballer, who played as a winger.

Early and personal life
Geoffrey Frederick Truett was born on 23 May 1935, in Forest Gate, Essex. He was evacuated to Amersham, Buckinghamshire during World War II, and as a youth he was involved in athletics, competing in shot put and javelin.

Truett was married with two children and five grandchildren.

Career
Truett began playing for Wycombe Wanderers alongside brother Jim, scoring 63 goals in 114 appearances in all competitions between 1952 and 1957. While playing with Wycombe, Truett won the Isthmian League in 1956 and 1957, and was a runner-up in the 1957 FA Amateur Cup. Following interest from a number of professional clubs, Truett was a member of the London XI team which played in Switzerland in 1957. Truett then played in the Football League for Crystal Palace, scoring 5 goals in 38 league appearances between 1957 and 1962. He later played for Tonbridge between 1962 and 1970, where he remains the player with the record number of starts, with 517 in all competitions, the only player to have more appearances was Mark Gillham. While playing with Tonbridge, Truett won the 1965 Kent Senior Cup and he was twice voted as the club's Player of the Year. Truett finished his career with Hastings United, retiring in 1973 at the age of 38. Truett combined his semi-professional playing career with working as a builder.

Later life and death
After retiring as a player Truett worked as a buyer for a number of building firms in the Croydon area. He died on 5 January 2015, aged 79, following a short illness. At the time of his death he was living in Copthorne, West Sussex with his daughter, after his wife had moved into a nursing home.

References

1930s births
2015 deaths
English footballers
Wycombe Wanderers F.C. players
London XI players
Crystal Palace F.C. players
Tonbridge Angels F.C. players
Hastings United F.C. (1948) players
English Football League players
Association football wingers